Lord Preston may refer to:

Thomas Preston, 1st Viscount Tara (1585–1655), an Irish soldier of the 17th century.
Richard Graham, 1st Viscount Preston (1648–1695), a courtier at the Court of Charles II of England and English ambassador to Paris. After the Glorious Revolution he conspired with other Jacobite conspirators

See also
Frederick Stanley, 16th Earl of Derby (1841–1908), known as Frederick Stanley until 1886 and as Lord Stanley of Preston between 1886 and 1893, was a Conservative Party politician in the United Kingdom who served as Colonial Secretary from 1885 to 1886 and the sixth Governor General of Canada from 1888 to 1893.